Tsukushi may refer to:

Places 
Tsukushi Province, old Japanese province, subsequently divided into
Chikuzen Province, old Japanese province, part of Fukuoka Prefecture without south and east Fukuoka
Chikugo Province, old Japanese province, the southern part of Fukuoka Prefecture, on Kyūshū
Kyushu, island of Japan, archaically called "Tsukushi-no-shima"

People 
Tsukushi Hirokado (1548–1615), second son of Tsukushi Korekado and warlord/kokujin of Chikuzen
Tsukushi (wrestler) (born 1997), Japanese professional wrestler
Akihito Tsukushi, author of the manga Made in Abyss

Other uses  
Tsukushi (protein), an extracellular proteoglycan
Japanese cruiser Tsukushi, an 1880 early unprotected cruiser
Spores or strobili of equisetum, used in Japanese cuisine